Carlos Alexandre de Souza Silva (born 1 August 1986), commonly known as Carlão, is a Brazilian professional footballer who plays as a striker.

Club career
Carlão was born in Duque de Caxias, Rio de Janeiro. On 28 April 2008, he signed a three-month contract with Duque de Caxias Futebol Clube for the rest of the Série B season, joining from São Cristóvão de Futebol e Regatas. On 11 February of the following year he was signed by U.D. Leiria in the Portuguese second division, where he quickly made an impact as he scored 11 goals in just 12 games to help his team return to the Primeira Liga after a one-year absence; this included four past S.C. Olhanense in a 5–1 home win, on 3 May.

Carlão only netted five times in his first full season, however, in 28 matches. In late December 2010, after being linked to fellow league side Sporting CP, he was sold to Kashima Antlers of the J1 League, and in July 2011 the Japanese club loaned him to Neuchâtel Xamax in Switzerland.

In early September 2011, still owned by Kashima, Carlão returned to Portugal and joined S.C. Braga. On 9 January 2012, after having come on as a substitute for Édson Rivera in the 60th minute of an away fixture against S.C. Beira-Mar, he scored the 2–1 winner.

On 19 February 2014, after a brief spell with F.C. Paços de Ferreira, Carlão moved to the China League One with Shijiazhuang Yongchan FC.

Honours
Braga
Taça da Liga: 2012–13

References

External links
CBF data 

1986 births
Living people
People from Duque de Caxias, Rio de Janeiro
Brazilian footballers
Association football forwards
Duque de Caxias Futebol Clube players
Primeira Liga players
Liga Portugal 2 players
U.D. Leiria players
S.C. Braga players
F.C. Paços de Ferreira players
F.C. Famalicão players
J1 League players
Kashima Antlers players
Swiss Super League players
Neuchâtel Xamax FCS players
China League One players
Cangzhou Mighty Lions F.C. players
Thai League 1 players
Ubon United F.C. players
Samut Prakan City F.C. players
Cypriot First Division players
Nea Salamis Famagusta FC players
Doxa Katokopias FC players
Brazilian expatriate footballers
Expatriate footballers in Portugal
Expatriate footballers in Japan
Expatriate footballers in Switzerland
Expatriate footballers in China
Expatriate footballers in Thailand
Expatriate footballers in Cyprus
Brazilian expatriate sportspeople in Portugal
Brazilian expatriate sportspeople in Japan
Brazilian expatriate sportspeople in Switzerland
Brazilian expatriate sportspeople in China
Brazilian expatriate sportspeople in Thailand
Brazilian expatriate sportspeople in Cyprus
Sportspeople from Rio de Janeiro (state)